The 1929–1930 Central European Cup for Amateurs was the first edition of the Central European International Cup for amateur teams. It was won by Poland, who took part for the first and only time.

Final standings

Matches

References

Central European International Cup